Karen Barefoot is an American basketball coach. She recently was head coach for the UNC Wilmington women's basketball team. Barefoot is the first basketball player to record 2,000 points and 1,000 assists in a career for any NCAA division, male or female.

Playing career 
Barefoot,  a Newport News, Virginia native, played high school basketball at Menchville High School, earning Most Outstanding Player honors from Peninsula Sports Club four times. She received scholarship offers from several colleges but chose to remain close to home and attended Christopher Newport University along with Sharon, her twin sister.

During her career at Christopher Newport, playing under coach Cathy Parson, she helped the team to three NCAA tournament invitations. In her freshman year the team made it to the Sweet 16. She earned Kodak/WBCA All-America honors during her career and was named the All–USA South Atlantic conference player of the year twice. She continued her domination of the Peninsula Sports Club honors, winning the most outstanding player award four times during her college career. She was the national leader in assists in 1991, 1992, 1993 and 1994 among Division III schools, amassing a total of 1002 assists in her career still the only Division III player to record over 1000 assists in a career. In addition to her assists records, Barefoot is the first basketball player to record 2000 points and 1000 assists in a career for any NCAA division, male or female.

Barefoot was inducted into the Christopher Newport University Athletics Hall of Fame in 1999.

Christopher Newport statistics

Source

Coaching career 

After completing her playing career and graduating, she formed the first ever athletics program for women at The Apprentice School, Located in Newport News, Virginia in 1995. She served as head coach for six seasons, culminating in a 24–3 record and a national championship in the National Small College Athletic Association. She was named the NSCAA National Coach of the Year in both 1999 and 2001.

In 2001, Barefoot moved to Lenoir Rhyne, a division II school in Hickory, North Carolina. she remained there for four years, recording double-digit wins in each year, and tying for first place in the South Atlantic Conference in 2004.

After four years there, Barefoot accepted a position as assistant coach under the legendary Wendy Larry at Old Dominion. She was very familiar with the ODU program because she had attended many games with her father and grandfather. She had a favorite player — Nancy Lieberman— in whose honor Barefoot chose to wear number 10 as a player number at Christopher Newport.

After three years as an assistant coach at the Division I level, Barefoot was invited to become the head coach of Elon. The first year turned out to be challenging as the team only won five games. In her third season, the team won 20 games the best results ever for the school as a Division I team and reached the quarterfinals of the WBI.

In 2011, Wendy Larry left Old Dominion after 24 seasons and the school reached out to Barefoot to become the new head coach. Barefoot remained at Old Dominion for six seasons, which included three invitations to the WNIT and advancement to the second round of the WNIT in 2014 and 2015.

In 2017, Barefoot was named coach of the UNC Wilmington women's basketball program.

Head coaching record
Sources:

References

Year of birth missing (living people)
Living people
American women's basketball coaches
Basketball coaches from Virginia
Basketball players from Virginia
Christopher Newport Captains basketball
Elon Phoenix women's basketball coaches
Lenoir–Rhyne Bears women's basketball coaches
Old Dominion Monarchs women's basketball coaches
Sportspeople from Newport News, Virginia
UNC Wilmington Seahawks women's basketball coaches
The Apprentice Builders